Imalka Mendis (born 21 September 1993) is a Sri Lankan cricketer who plays for Sri Lanka's women's cricket team. She made her One Day International (ODI) debut against Australia on 18 September 2016. She made her Women's Twenty20 International cricket (WT20I) debut for Sri Lanka Women against Pakistan Women on 28 March 2018.

References

External links
 

1993 births
Living people
Sri Lankan women cricketers
Sri Lanka women One Day International cricketers
Sri Lanka women Twenty20 International cricketers
People from Southern Province, Sri Lanka